Ernesto Emanuel Walker Willis (born February 9, 1999) is a Panamanian professional footballer who plays for Tauro FC.

Club career
After beginning his career with CAI La Chorrera and moving to Plaza Amador in July 2018, Walker joined USL Championship side LA Galaxy II on 21 February 2019 for a season-long loan.

International
He made his debut for Panama on 27 January 2019 in a friendly against the United States, as a starter.

References

External links
 

1999 births
Living people
Sportspeople from Panama City
Association football midfielders
Panamanian footballers
Panamanian expatriate footballers
Panama international footballers
C.D. Plaza Amador players
LA Galaxy II players
Tauro F.C. players
Liga Panameña de Fútbol players
USL Championship players
2019 CONCACAF Gold Cup players
Panamanian expatriate sportspeople in the United States
Expatriate soccer players in the United States